Định Tường was a province of Vietnam during the Nguyen dynasty and South Vietnam. In February 1976, it and Gò Công province were merged to form Tiền Giang province.

References

Former provinces of Vietnam